W. Turrentine "Turpie" Jackson (1915, Ruston, Louisiana – 28 May 2000) was an American professor of history, specializing in Western U.S. history.

Biography
Jackson grew up in El Paso, Texas. He graduated in 1935 with B.A. from Texas Western College (now the University of Texas at El Paso) and in 1940 with Ph.D. from the University of Texas at Austin, where his thesis advisor was Walter Prescott Webb. Jackson taught at UCLA, Iowa State University, the University of Chicago, the University of Glasgow, and four other universities and also served in the intelligence division of the U. S. Navy, before he joined in 1951 the faculty of the history department of the University of California, Davis. He taught there until he began phased retirement in 1982 with full retirement in 1985.

Jackson's research covered policy history and social history. He debunked the stereotype of rugged individualism and small property owners in the Old West with evidence for development involving U.S. government surveys, U.S. federal subsidies, and international capital. He published extensively and served on the editorial boards of several academic journals. Three of his books won prizes.

Wells Fargo hired Jackson as a consultant and corporate historian.

Awards and honors
 1957 — Guggenheim Fellowship for the academic year 1957–1958
 1964 — Guggenheim Fellowship for the academic year 1964–1965
 1977 — elected president of the Western History Association

Selected publications

Articles

Books
  1979 pbk reprint
 with Maurice Frink and Agnes Wright Spring: 
  2016 ebook

as editor

References

External links
 

1915 births
2000 deaths
20th-century American historians
20th-century American male writers
University of Texas at El Paso alumni
University of Texas at Austin alumni
University of California, Davis faculty
Historians of the American West
American male non-fiction writers